The D'eux Tour is the sixth concert tour by Celine Dion. The tour was organized to support the highly successful tenth French language and thirteenth studio album D'eux (1995).

History
After 5 concerts in Quebec City, Canada, Celine toured Europe for four months. Dion crossed 11 countries and gave 42 sold-out concerts, among which 9 in Paris, France, most in rooms of at least 14,000 seats. One of the opening acts was made by the group The Corrs (in the United Kingdom and Ireland). During one of the spectacles at the Zenith de Paris Celine broke her voice.

Broadcasts and recordings

The show at Zénith de Paris in Paris was recorded before an audience of over 6,000 fans and released on CD in October 1996 as Live à Paris. The next month a VHS under the same name was issued. The home video was re-released on DVD in November 2003.

Personnel

Band
Musical director and keyboards: Claude "Mego" Lemay
Drums: Dominique Messier
Bass: Marc Langis
Keyboards: Yves Frulla
Guitars: André Coutu
Percussions: Paul Picard
Backing vocalists: Terry Bradford, Elise Duguay, Rachelle Jeanty

Production
Tour director: Suzanne Gingue
Production director: Ian Donald
Assistant to the tour director: Michel Dion
Front of house sound engineer: Danis Savage
Stage sound engineer: Daniel Baron
Sound system technician: François Desjardins, Marc Beauchamp
Lighting director: Yves Aucoin
Assistant lighting director: Normand Chassé
Lighting technician: Jean-François Canuel
Band gear technician: Jean-François Dubois, Guy Vignola
Production assistant: Patrick Angélil
Tour assistant: Jean-Pierre Angélil, Louise Labranche
Bodyguard: Eric Burrows
Hairstylist: Louis Hechter
Stylist: Annie L. Horth
Choreographer: Dominique Giraldeau

Opening acts
The Corrs

Setlist

Tour dates

References

Celine Dion concert tours
1995 concert tours
1996 concert tours